This list of museums in Wales contains museums which are defined for this context as institutions (including nonprofit organisations, government entities, and private businesses) that collect and care for objects of cultural, artistic, scientific, or historical interest and make their collections or related exhibits available for public viewing. Also included are non-profit art galleries and university art galleries.  

Museums that exist only in cyberspace (i.e. virtual museums) are not included.  Those marked 'NMW' are part of the network of National Museum Wales.

Defunct museums
 Bersham Heritage Centre
 Cae Dai 50s Museum, Denbigh, website, destroyed by fire in 2009
 Celtica, Machynlleth, Powys
 Griffithstown Railway Museum, Pontypool, closed by owner in 2011
 Llanrwst Almshouse Museum, Llanrwst, closed in 2011
 Museum of Childhood Memories, Beaumaris

See also
Conservation in the United Kingdom

References

Wales
 
Museums
Museums
Museums
Museums